Lady Louisa Tenison (c. 1820 - 27 Aug 1882) was an English artist, traveler and author.

Biography 
Lady Louisa Mary Anne Anson (later Tenison) was the daughter of Thomas Anson, 1st Earl of Lichfield and his wife Louisa Catherine Philips, the eldest of their 8 children.

She married Lt. Col Edward King-Tenison on 26 Nov 1838. They had two daughters, Louisa Frances Mary and Florence Margaret Christina. Her husband was an MP and in the 1840s became intensely interested in the emerging practice of photography.

She and her husband traveled through Egypt, Palestine and Syria in 1843, which led her to create a series of drawings of sites such as Karnak, Petra and the Church of the Holy Sepulchre, later published in her book Sketches in the East. Several years later, she documented their tour of Spain in her work Castile and Andalucia, which she wrote and also co-illustrated along with painter Egron Lundgren. She also assisted James Uwins (nephew of Thomas Uwins RA) with his drawings of the city of Granada, which were the source for paintings by Robert Burford exhibited at the Leicester Square Panorama in 1853.

She lived with her husband at Kilronan Castle, Co Roscommon - a family estate which she and her husband significantly enlarged in the 1870s. She took an active role in the building works, notably dismissing the builder Sir Thomas Newenham Deane after a disagreement over cost overruns.  She died in Trieste on 27 Aug 1882.

In art and literature 
Her portrait by John Phillip is part of the collection of the Royal Scottish Academy of Art & Architecture.

A book entitled The Book of Fenagh or of St. Caillin was dedicated to her, recognising her commitment both to "the land of her adoption" as well as her knowledge of the Celtic language. She and her husband supported the translation of the book and also supplied early photographs of Fenagh.

One of her watercolour paintings featured in Sketches in the East, depicting the House of the British consul in Damascus, resides in the UK government art collection. In the book, she describes this room as being "one of the most splendid in Damascus."

References

Sources

1882 deaths
19th-century English painters
English women painters
Daughters of British earls
19th-century British women artists
19th-century English women